Danielius Dolskis (April 13, 1891 – December 3, 1931) was a popular Lithuanian singer noted in pre-revolutionary Russia and in inter-war Lithuania.

Dolskis sang in Saint Petersburg until 1917. He also performed in Moscow, Odessa, and Kiev. After the October Revolution, he moved to Riga, Latvia. In 1929, Dolskis moved to Kaunas, Lithuania, where he performed in restaurants.

In 1931, after a performance, Dolskis drank some cold beer and came down with pneumonia. He died several days later.

References
 

1891 births
1931 deaths
Lithuanian pop singers
20th-century Lithuanian male singers
Musicians from Vilnius
Lithuanian Jews
Musicians from Kaunas
Male singers from the Russian Empire